Katra Medniganj is a town and a nagar panchayat in Pratapgarh district in the Indian state of Uttar Pradesh. The town is named Katra Medniganj to pay the respects to a great freedom fighter of 18th century, Shree Babu Medini Singh, brother of the soldier Babu Gulab Singh.

Demographics
 India census, Katra Medniganj had a population of 7,815. Males constitute 49% of the population and females 51%. Katra Medniganj has an average literacy rate of 65%, higher than the national average of 59.5%: male literacy is 72%, and female literacy is 58%. In Katra Medniganj, 16% of the population is under 6 years of age.
It is situated near the Bhupiamau and Allahabad Faizabad road. It is situated 49 km from Allahabad and 90 km from District Raebareli.

References

Cities and towns in Pratapgarh district, Uttar Pradesh